Longsheng station is a station on Line 4 of the Shenzhen Metro. The station opened on 16 June 2011. It is located on Heping Road in Bao'an District, Shenzhen.

Station layout

Exits

References

External links
 Shenzhen Metro Longsheng Station (Chinese)
 Shenzhen Metro Longsheng Station (English)

Railway stations in Guangdong
Shenzhen Metro stations
Longhua District, Shenzhen
Railway stations in China opened in 2011